Drawing Flies is a 1996 comedy film from Kevin Smith's View Askew Productions. It was written, directed, and edited by filmmakers Malcolm Ingram and Matt Gissing, with financial backing from Smith and Scott Mosier.

Synopsis
After they get cut off welfare, Donner (Jason Lee) leads four of his jobless, penniless roommates on a journey to find a cabin in the woods that belongs to his uncle. They get lost and stranded in the woods, without food or water or their bearings when their van breaks down. He eventually reveals to his roommates that the search for the cabin is really a search for Sasquatch. They, of course, think he's crazy. But to make matters worse, they uncover all kinds of bizarre and dangerous activity as they wander through the woods in search of not only Bigfoot himself, but any hope of a future.

Cast

Production notes
While making Mallrats, Kevin Smith met Canadian Film Threat journalist Malcolm Ingram and his friend Matt Gissing; the three decided to make Drawing Flies, the title of which is based on a Soundgarden song from the album Badmotorfinger. Along with much of the cast of Mallrats, Smith headed up to the Canadian wilderness and made the film. The same camera and type of film stock that was used to film Clerks was used to film Drawing Flies. The film was only featured at a few film festivals before it was given a DVD release in 2002.  Kevin Smith wears his "Silent Bob" outfit from Mallrats and is credited as "Silent Bob", although the character is referred to as John. He never utters a line.

Home media
The film was released on DVD on February 26, 2002.

References

External links

 

1996 films
English-language Canadian films
Canadian comedy films
Films set in Vancouver
View Askew Productions films
Films directed by Malcolm Ingram
Bigfoot films
1996 comedy films
1990s English-language films
1990s Canadian films